Antonio Watripon (1822–1864) was a French journalist, critic and Republican activist.

Life
Antonio Watripon was born in Beauvais in 1822. In 1847 he founded the Lanterne du Quartier Latin. He and Alfred Delvau founded the Aimable faubourien, journal de la canaille in 1848. He wrote under several pseudonyms, including Jules Choux au Père Duchêne, Tony Fanfan, Anacharsis Croton-Duvivier and Joseph Devimes. He was the editor of Journal des Écoles, and a friend of Baudelaire.

Works
 Histoire politique des écoles et des étudiants depuis le Moyen âge jusqu'à 1850: 1ère partie, 1815-1830, 1850.
 François Villon, 1857.
 Echos de jeunesse : les trois âges du pays latin, 1863.

References

1822 births
1864 deaths
French journalists
French republicans